This is a list of banks in China, including Mainland China, Hong Kong, and Macau. 

The central bank of the People's Republic of China is the People's Bank of China, a component of the State Council, the Central Government of China. The People's Bank of China is mainly responsible for issuing the Renminbi and administering its circulation, in addition to formulating and implementing monetary policy in accordance with Chinese law. Its counterparts in the special administrative regions of Hong Kong and Macau are the Hong Kong Monetary Authority and the Monetary Authority of Macao respectively, both of which serve as their respective locale's currency board and de facto central bank.

Banks in Mainland China
All banks, save the People's Bank of China, are under the supervision of China Banking and Insurance Regulatory Commission.

Policy banks
China has three policy banks. Among them, China Development Bank was incorporated in December 2008 and officially defined by the State Council as a development finance institution in March 2015.

State-owned Commercial Banks
China has six state-owned commercial banks. These banks are ranked by their Tier 1 capital amount as of 2018. Banks with asterisks (*) are the four major state-owned banks (i.e. the "Big Four Banks").

Bank of Communications was founded in 1908. On 1 April 1987, it was restructured and re-commenced operations as the first state-owned bank in China.

Postal Savings Bank of China has the most outlets of any retail bank in China (~40,000). Over 80% of its outlets accompany China Post post offices.

Commercial Banks 
China has 12 national commercial banks. These banks are ordered by their Tier 1 capital amount as of 2018.

City Commercial Banks 

City commercial banks were transferred from urban credit cooperatives established in 1980s and 1990s.
Bank of Jiujiang
Bank of Beijing
Bank of Shanghai
Bank of Jiangsu
Bank of Ningbo
Bank of Dalian
Bank of Taizhou
Bank of Tianjin
Xiamen International Bank
Tai'an Bank
Shengjing Bank (Shenyang)
Harbin Bank
Bank of Jilin

Rural Commercial Banks 
Rural commercial banks were converted from rural credit cooperatives and play an important role in rural financial needs. Some rural commercial banks include Beijing Rural Commercial Bank, Shanghai Rural Commercial Bank, and Chongqing Rural Commercial Bank.

Internet Banks and other private banks 

WeBank (China) (Shenzhen) – The first private bank and Internet bank in China, initiated by Tencent.
MYbank (Hangzhou) – Internet bank in China, established by Ant Financial Services Group
Shanghai Huarui Bank
Wenzhou Minshang Bank
Liaoning Zhenxing Bank

Other banks 

Bank of Kunlun (昆仑银行)
SiliBank (实利银行)
Bank of Lanzhou
Bank of Gansu

Branches and subsidiaries of foreign banks
The China Banking Regulatory Commission (CBRC) announced its approval for nine foreign-funded banks to start their preparatory work for setting up local corporations in China on 24 December 2006. Following this, additional banks have been able to incorporate locally. 

The following is a non-exhaustive list. Asterisks (*) indicate that the bank does not service individuals.

ABN AMRO (Netherlands) (now RBS China due to de-merging)
Australia and New Zealand Banking Group
Banco Santander
Bank Mandiri
Bank of America Merrill Lynch
Bank of Montreal (Canada)
Bank of New York Mellon
Barclays Bank
BBVA Bank
BNP Paribas
Citibank (United States)
Commerzbank
Commonwealth Bank of Australia
Crédit Agricole
Credit Suisse
Dah Sing Bank
Dah Sing Bank (Hong Kong)
DBS Bank (Singapore)
Deutsche Bank
Fubon Bank (Taiwan)
Hana Bank (South Korea)
Hang Seng Bank (Hong Kong)
ING Bank
Intesa Sanpaolo
JPMorgan Chase Bank (United States)*
KASIKORNBANK (开泰银行)
KBC Bank
Mizuho Corporate Bank (Japan)*
National Australia Bank
Natixis
Norddeutsche Landesbank
OCBC Wing Hang Bank (Hong Kong)
Oversea-Chinese Banking Corporation (Singapore)
Rabobank
Raiffeisen Bank International
Scotiabank (Canada)
Shinhan Bank (South Korea)
Societe Generale (France)
SPD Silicon Valley Bank
Standard Chartered Bank (United Kingdom)
The Bank of East Asia (Hong Kong)
The Bank of Tokyo-Mitsubishi UFJ (Japan)*
The Hongkong and Shanghai Banking Corporation (Hong Kong – see HSBC Bank (China))
UBS
United Overseas Bank (Singapore)
VTB Bank
Wells Fargo Bank
Westpac Bank
Woori Bank (South Korea)

Banks in the Special Administrative Regions

Hong Kong
The currency board and  central bank of Hong Kong is Hong Kong Monetary Authority.

Banknotes of the Hong Kong Dollar, the official currency of the HKSAR, is issued by Hong Kong Monetary Authority, Bank of China (Hong Kong), HSBC and Standard Chartered (Hong Kong).

Part of commercial banks in Hong Kong are listed below.

Bank of China (Hong Kong) Limited
Bank of East Asia Limited
China Construction Bank (Asia) Corporation Limited
Chiyu Banking Corporation Limited
Chong Hing Bank Limited
Citibank (Hong Kong) Limited
CITIC Ka Wah Bank Limited
Columbia Bank Limited
Dah Sing Bank Limited
DBS Bank (Hong Kong) Limited
East Asia Banking Corporation Limited
Fubon Bank (Hong Kong) Limited
Hang Seng Bank Ltd.
Hongkong and Shanghai Banking Corporation Limited
Industrial and Commercial Bank of China (Asia) Limited
MEVAS Bank Limited
Nanyang Commercial Bank Limited
OCBC Wing Hang Bank Limited  (Banco OCBC Weng Hang, S.A.)
Public Bank (Hong Kong) Limited
Shanghai Commercial Bank Ltd.
Standard Bank Asia Limited
Standard Chartered Bank (Hong Kong) Limited
Tai Sang Bank Ltd.
Tai Yau Bank Ltd.
Wing Lung Bank Limited
Bank of East West China

Macau 
The currency board and de facto central bank of Macau is the Monetary Authority of Macao.

Banknotes of the Macau pataca, the official currency of the Macau SAR, is issued by  Banco da China, Sucursal de Macau and Banco Nacional Ultramarino.

Some commercial banks in Macau are listed below:

 OCBC Wing Hang Bank Limited  – Banco Weng Hang, S.A.
 Banco Delta Asia Limited – Banco Delta Ásia, S.A.R.L.
 China Construction Bank (Macau) Corporation Limited – Banco de Construção da China (Macau), S.A.
 Industrial and Commercial Bank of China (Macau) – Banco Industrial e Comercial da China (Macau), S.A.
 Luso International Banking Limited – Banco Luso Internacional, S.A.
 Banco Comercial de Macau, S.A. – Banco Comercial Português, S.A.
 The Macau Chinese Bank Ltd. – Banco Chinês de Macau, S.A.
 Banco Nacional Ultramarino, S.A. – Banco Nacional Ultramarino, S.A.
 Well Link Bank, S.A. – Well Link Bank, S.A.

See also 
 List of banks
 List of companies in China
 List of financial regulatory authorities by country
 Belt and Road Initiative
 People's Bank of China – the central bank of China
 Cross-Border Inter-Bank Payments System

Notes

References

External links 
 "Microbanking in China" by Wang Kejin (APEC 2002 report)

China
Banks
China